SOAP-over-UDP is an OASIS standard covering the publication of SOAP messages over UDP transport protocol,
providing for One-Way and Request-Response message patterns.

External links 

Web service specifications
Web services
XML-based standards